ICSA Women's College Sailor of the Year, also known as Quantum Women's College Sailor of the Year Trophy due to sponsorship by Quantum Sails, is a sailing award annually presented, since 2003, to Inter-Collegiate Sailing Association (ICSA)’s outstanding female collegiate sailor of the year.

History

References

External links 
Official Website